A leadership election was held by the United Malays National Organisation (UMNO) party on 26 March 2009. It was won by then Deputy Prime Minister and then Deputy President of UMNO, Najib Razak.

Supreme Council election results
Source

Permanent Chairman

Deputy Permanent Chairman

President

Deputy President

Vice Presidents

Supreme Council Members

See also
2013 Malaysian general election
First Najib cabinet

References

2009 elections in Malaysia
United Malays National Organisation leadership election
United Malays National Organisation leadership elections